Dichomeris chinganella is a moth in the family Gelechiidae. It was described by Hugo Theodor Christoph in 1882. It is found in south-eastern Siberia, Japan and Turkey.

The length of the forewings is 9–10 mm. The forewings are reddish grey with whitish, yellowish or dark brownish strigulation and four blackish-brown spots. The hindwings are light brownish grey.

References

Moths described in 1882
chinganella